Van Ness may refer to:

People
 Bethann Beall Faris Van Ness (1902–1993), American writer, YWCA executive
 Cornelius P. Van Ness (1782–1852), Governor of Vermont, judge and diplomat
 Frederick Van Ness Bradley (1898–1947), U.S. Representative from Michigan
 George Van Ness Lothrop (1817–1897), Michigan politician
 James Van Ness (1808–1872), son of Cornelius P. Van Ness, Mayor of San Francisco (1855–1856)
 John Peter Van Ness (1769–1846), U.S. Representative from New York and Mayor of Washington, D.C. (1830–1834)
 John Wilson Van Ness (1894–), business executive, President pro tempore of the Indiana Senate (1946–1957), from Valparaiso, Indiana
 Jonathan Van Ness (born 1987), American television personality
 Marcia Van Ness (1782–1832), American socialite
 Michael E. Van Ness (born 1974), American astronomer at the Lowell Observatory and discoverer of comets
 Philip van Ness Myers (1846–1937), American historian
 William P. Van Ness (1778–1826), United States District Judge

Places
Van Ness–UDC station, a subway station in Washington, D.C.
Forest Hills (Washington, D.C.), frequently referred to as "Van Ness", served by the Van Ness–UDC metro station
Van Ness Avenue, named for James Van Ness
Van Ness Bus Rapid Transit, a transit project on Van Ness Avenue
Van Ness station a subway station on Van Ness Avenue
Van Ness Avenue Elementary School, Los Angeles
Van Ness Mausoleum, Washington, D.C., constructed for the wife of John Peter Van Ness

Other
Van Ness' Regiment of Militia, a New York unit in the American Revolutionary War

See also

Van Nes, a Dutch surname
Vanness Wu (b. 1978), Taiwanese-American actor and singer
Carol Vaness (b. 1952), American soprano
 
 Vannes (disambiguation)
 Van (disambiguation)
 Ness (disambiguation)